The Best of Millennium is a soundtrack album of music written and composed by Mark Snow for the television series Millennium. The album was released through iTunes.

Track listings 

The X-Files music
2003 soundtrack albums
Television soundtracks
Mark Snow albums
ITunes-exclusive releases
Instrumental soundtracks